Hindsight (also known as Sees Everything In Hindsight) is the second album by rapper John Reuben, released on May 21, 2002.

Track listing
"I'll Try Harder"
"I John Reu"
"Hindsight"
"Big E Cypher Session"
"Soundman"
"Run the Night"
"Breathe"
"I Pictured It"
"01/08/02"
"Doin'"
"Thank You" (feat. Manchild of Mars ILL & Othello)
"DJ Manuel"
"Up and at Them"
"Defensive Offender"
"Pataskala"

References

2002 albums
John Reuben albums
Gotee Records albums